Yin Menglu (born 27 January 2002) is a Chinese paralympic badminton player. She participated at the 2020 Summer Paralympics in the badminton competition, being awarded the bronze medal in the women's singles WH1 event. Menglu also participated in the women's doubles WH1–WH2 event, being awarded the silver medal with her teammate, Liu Yutong.

Achievements

Paralympic Games 
Women's singles

Women's doubles

World Championships 
Women's singles

Women's doubles

International Tournaments (2 titles, 6 runners-up) 
Women's singles

Women's doubles

Mixed doubles

References 

Living people
Place of birth missing (living people)
Chinese female badminton players
Paralympic badminton players of China
Paralympic bronze medalists for China
Paralympic silver medalists for China
Paralympic medalists in badminton
Badminton players at the 2020 Summer Paralympics
Medalists at the 2020 Summer Paralympics
2002 births